Sparganothis azulispecca is a species of moth of the family Tortricidae. It is found in Alabama in the United States.

References

Moths described in 2012
Sparganothis